Henri Koch (born October 14, 1904, date of death unknown) was a Luxembourgian bobsledder who competed in the 1930s.  He competed in the two-man event at the 1936 Winter Olympics, but crashed out during the fourth run and did not finish.

References
1936 bobsleigh two-man results
1936 Olympic Winter Games official report. - p. 419.
COSL-ALO profile 

1904 births
Bobsledders at the 1936 Winter Olympics
Luxembourgian male bobsledders
Olympic bobsledders of Luxembourg
Year of death missing